The Everglades Correctional Institution (also ECI) is a Level 5 security prison facility for adult males in unincorporated Miami-Dade County, in the state of Florida, near Miami. Originally planned as a mental health facility, it was converted to a major Correctional institution in 1995.

The Total Staff is 302 (as of July 2012) and has a Maximum Inmate Capacity of 1,788.

In 2022, Maverick City Music and Kirk Franklin recorded the album Kingdom Book One at the facility, with 1,300 inmates participating in the recording. The album aimed to spotlight the injustices around mass incarceration in the United States.

References

Prisons in Florida
Buildings and structures in Miami-Dade County, Florida
1995 establishments in Florida